Rancho El Sur  was a   Mexican land grant in present-day Monterey County, California on the Big Sur coast given in 1834 by Governor José Figueroa to Juan Bautista Alvarado. The grant extended from the mouth of Little Sur River inland about 2.5 miles (4.0 km) over the coastal mountains and south along the coast past the mouth of the Big Sur River to Cooper's Point. In about 1892, the rancho land plus an additional  of resale homestead land was divided into two major parcels. The southern  became the Molera Ranch, later the foundation of Andrew Molera State Park. The northern  formed the El Sur Ranch.

History 

Before the arrival of Europeans, the land was occupied by the Esselen people, who resided along the upper Carmel and Arroyo Seco Rivers, and along the Big Sur coast from near present-day Hurricane Point to the vicinity of Vicente Creek in the south. The native people were heavily affected by the establishment of three Spanish Missions near them from 1770 to 1791. The native population was decimated by disease, including measles, smallpox, and syphilis, which wiped out 90 percent of the native population, and by conscript labor, poor food, and forced assimilation. Most of the Esselen people's villages within the current Los Padres National Forest were left largely uninhabited.

Spanish grant 
 

Alvarado filed a claim for Rancho El Sur on May 14, 1834 in which he stated that he had first petitioned for a provisional grant on August 12, 1830, and repeated his petition on February 26, 1831. He stated that he maintained "at this time ... more than three hundred head of large cattle and nearly an[sic] hundred horses, all my own property, and have built a house and pens." Mexican Governor José Figueroa granted Rancho El Sur comprising two square leagues of land on the Big Sur coast to Juan Bautista Alvarado (1809 -1882) in 1834. 

Captain John B. R. Cooper was Alvarado's uncle by marriage to Maria Jerónima de la Encarnación Vallejo, the sister of Governor Mariano Guadalupe Vallejo. Cooper was apparently involved in managing the ranch as early as 1834, when he negotiated an agreement with Job Dye to permit him to raise mules on the property.

In 1840, Alvarado traded ownership of Rancho El Sur to Captain John B. R. Cooper in exchange for the more accessible and readily farmed  Rancho Bolsa del Potrero y Moro Cojo south of present-day Castroville in the Salinas Valley.

When Mexico ceded California to the United States following the Mexican-American War, the 1848 Treaty of Guadalupe Hidalgo provided that the land grants would be honored. But California passed the Land Act of 1851, which required grantees to provide legal proof of their title. Cooper filed a claim for Rancho El Sur with the Public Land Commission in 1852 and he received the legal land patent after years of litigation in 1866.

Cooper never actually lived at the ranch, but various family members and ranch workers continuously occupied it from 1840 onward. In the 1850s Cooper landed smuggled goods at the mouth of Big Sur River to avoid the heavy customs charges levied by the Americans at Monterey.

Next generation 

After John B. R. Cooper's death in 1872, the ranch was divided into four parts: their son John Bautista Henry Cooper received the first section. On March 12, 1871, 40 year old John B. H. Cooper had married 18 year old Martha Brawley, a cousin of Abraham Lincoln, at the San Carlos Cathedral. 

John B. R. Cooper's widow Maria Encarnación Vallejo also received one-quarter of the land, and their two surviving daughters, Anna Maria de Guadalupe Cooper and Francisca Guadalupe Amelia Cooper, received the remaining portions. John B. H. Cooper became a Monterey County supervisor and managed Rancho Bolsa del Potrero y Moro Cojo between present-day Castroville and Salinas. Later in life he lived in San Francisco while continuing to own the ranch. J. B. H. Cooper and his wife Martha had four children: Alice, John, Abelarde, and Alfred. J. B. H. built a new home on Rancho El Sur for his family but died on June 21, 1899, soon after its completion, and before he could live there. Martha Brawley Cooper received  of her husband's  estate. By 1904, she had added  to her share of the ranch. 

After her son Alfred died in an automobile accident on September 2, 1913, his two siblings assigned their interest in the estate including his share of the Rancho to their mother, Martha.

John B. H. Cooper's sister Francisca Amelia married Eusebius J. Molera, an engineer and architect born in Spain, on March 28, 1876, in Vallejo, California. She retained her share of the rancho she inherited from her parents. The marriage between the Cooper and Molera families left a legacy marked by their names on notable places throughout the region, including the Cooper-Molera Adobe in Monterey.

Francisca and Eusebius Molera had a son and daughter, Andrew and Frances. Andrew built up a successful dairy operation. His Monterey Jack cheese was especially well-liked. A report in the Monterey Daily Express on June 9, 1911, reported that there was "good demand for the Spanish cheese all over the state." "It is not believed that the cheese is made in any other section of the state. Andrew and Frances maintained a residence for most of their lives on Sacramento Street in San Francisco. The census record records their occupation as "farmer" and, indicative or their relative wealth, recorded the presence of a cook and maid living with them. During the time the Cooper family owned the land, they managed it as a cattle ranch and dairy, employing Hispanic and Indian vaqueros. They supported a school and community center. Big Sur pioneer Sam Trotter wrote about attending the "big dance Saturday night at the Cooper hall near the mouth of Big Sur [River] on the Cooper grant."

Family sells property 

In 1928, Henry C. Hunt, a business man from Carmel-by-the-Sea, purchased the northern  from John B. H. Cooper's widow, Martha Cooper Hughes (née Brawley) Vasquez, for about $500,000. On November 28, 1931, he announced that he had arranged to lease the remaining  from her.

Modern use 

The ranch was partitioned into fifteen lots by 1892. The Native American trail along the coast had been improved over time by the homesteaders and ranchers. They improved it until wagons could travel the road from Monterey to Big Sur in less than a day in 1900. It remained impassable in wet weather. In 1897, Harold W. Fairbanks and Maynard Dixon traversed the coast over a two-week period. They wrote:

Andrew Molera State Park 

Cooper's daughter, Amelia, married Spanish engineer Eusebio Joseph Molera in 1875. Their son Andrew Molera and his sister Frances inherited the  ranch. Andrew was very obese and died of a sudden heart attack in 1931. Frances inherited his portion of the land. 

In 1965, almost 100 years after her family gained title, she sold  of the original land grant west of Highway 1 to The Nature Conservancy with the intent it become a state park. She stipulated that the park should be named Andrew Molera State Park in honor of her brother.  The conservancy held the beachfront property in trust until the state of California could finance the purchase of the land. She died in 1968. She added provisions to the sale requiring that the land remain relatively undeveloped. When the California state park administration began to propose considerable development for the park, the Nature Conservancy threatened to revoke the sale arrangement, and the state backed down.

The state bought the remainder of the land east of Highway 1 from her estate soon after.

El Sur Ranch 

Lots one through thirteen now comprise the El Sur Ranch. It has been owned by the Hill family since 1958, who run a commercial cow-calf operation with about 450 head on the ranch.

Historic structures 
 Cooper Cabin. Built for John Cooper in 1861 on his ranch.

See also
Ranchos of California
List of Ranchos of California

References 
 

 This article incorporates public domain content from United States and California government sources. 

El Sur, The
Ranchos of Monterey County, California
The El Sur
Big Sur